Ignatovskaya is a rural locality (a village) in Verkhovskoye Rural Settlement, Tarnogsky District, Vologda Oblast, Russia. The population was 46 as of 2002.

Geography 
Ignatovskaya is located 43 km west of Tarnogsky Gorodok (the district's administrative centre) by road. Velikaya is the nearest rural locality.

References 

Rural localities in Tarnogsky District